Veľký Cetín is a village and municipality in the Nitra District in western central Slovakia, in the Nitra Region.

History
In historical records the village was first mentioned in 1239.

Geography
The village lies at an altitude of 137 metres and covers an area of 16.866 km². It has a population of 1604 people.

Ethnicity
The population is 1,115 (69%) Magyar, 376 (23%) Slovak and 113 (7%) others.

References

External links
https://web.archive.org/web/20070513023228/http://www.statistics.sk/mosmis/eng/run.html

Villages and municipalities in Nitra District